The Ratlam–Udaipur City Express is an Express train belonging to West Central Railway zone that runs between  and  in India. It is currently being operated with 19327/19328 train numbers on a daily basis.

Service

The 19327/Ratlam Udaipur City Express has an average speed of 42 km/hr and covers 306 km in 7h 14m. The 19328/Udaipur City–Ratlam Express has an average speed of 45 km/hr and covers 306 km in 6h 45m.

Route and halts 

The important halts of the train are:

Coach composition

The train has standard ICF rakes with max speed of 110 kmph. The train consists of 12 coaches:

 10 General
 2 Seating cum Luggage Rake

Traction

Both trains are hauled by a Ratlam Loco Shed-based WDM-3A or WDM-2A diesel locomotive from Udaipur to Ratlam, and vice versa.

Rake sharing

The trains shares its rake with 59811/59812 Haldighati Passenger and 59813/59814 Kota–Yamuna Bridge Agra Passenger

See also 

 Udaipur City railway station
 Ratlam Junction railway station
 Veer Bhumi Chittaurgarh Express

Notes

References

External links 

 19327/Ratlam Udaipur City Express
 19328/Udaipur City - Ratlam Express

Transport in Ratlam
Transport in Udaipur
Express trains in India
Rail transport in Madhya Pradesh
Rail transport in Rajasthan